Hugo Erfurt (13 February 1834 in Schwelm – 4 March 1922 in Dahlhausen at Beyenburg) was a German pharmacist and inventor.

Life 

He invented ingrain wallpaper (woodchip) in 1864.

Erfurt was married.

External links 
 Erfurt.com:Hugo Erfurt

German pharmacists
19th-century German inventors
1834 births
1922 deaths